Les Salles-du-Gardon is a commune in the Gard department in southern France.

Population

Notable people
 

David Giraudo (born 1970), footballer

See also
Communes of the Gard department

References

Communes of Gard